The Adventure of Faustus Bidgood is a 1986 surreal Canadian comedy film directed by Andy Jones and written by Andy and Mike Jones, with the collaboration of a number of workshop participants. It stars Andy Jones and Greg Malone.

Plot

Andy Jones stars as Faustus Bidgood, a clerk in the Newfoundland provincial department of education who harbours secret dreams of becoming president of Newfoundland and leading the province to secede from Canada.  The film contains several levels of what might be termed competing "realities, " oscillating between visions of mundane office work and sequences in which Bidgood accidentally leads a revolution, and containing a film within a film that narrates Faustus' real life and imaginary rise to power.

In the film within a film, we learn that Faustus' paternal grandfather has predicted that a great man will lead the people of Newfoundland to glory.  His name is the Reverend Dempster Peebles, although his son (Faustus' father) is named Bruce Bidgood and Faustus full name is Faustus Peebles Bidgood.

Cast

The film also stars Jones' CODCO colleagues Robert Joy and Brian Downey, respectively, as Bidgood's boss and a government official who plans to indoctrinate students in a cultish geometric theory known as Total Education. Greg Malone appears as a figment of Faustus' imagination, who acts as both his conscience and as a revolutionary spokesman in Faustus' dream of taking over Newfoundland.

Production

Faustus Bidgood, the first feature film ever produced entirely in Newfoundland with a Newfoundland cast, crew, and funding, was initiated in 1977 and took ten years to complete. It satirizes and comments on aspects of Newfoundland politics and culture, and sends up traditional religious and historical expectations that great men are the prime movers of cultural and social change.

Reception

1987 Genie Awards - (nominations) - Best Original Screenplay; Best Achievement - Film Editing; Best Original Song

References

External links
 

1986 films
English-language Canadian films
1980s English-language films
Canadian political comedy films
Films set in Newfoundland and Labrador
Films shot in Newfoundland and Labrador
1986 comedy films
1980s Canadian films